Murder is the unlawful killing of another human without justification or valid excuse, especially the unlawful killing of another human with malice aforethought. This state of mind may, depending upon the jurisdiction, distinguish murder from other forms of unlawful homicide, such as manslaughter.  Manslaughter is killing committed in the absence of malice, brought about by reasonable provocation, or diminished capacity. Involuntary manslaughter, where it is recognized, is a killing that lacks all but the most attenuated guilty intent, recklessness.

Most societies consider murder to be an extremely serious crime, and thus that a person convicted of murder should receive harsh punishments for the purposes of retribution, deterrence, rehabilitation, or incapacitation. In most countries, a person convicted of murder generally faces a long-term prison sentence, a life sentence, or capital punishment.

Etymology
The modern English word "murder" descends from the Proto-Indo-European *mŕ̥-trom which meant "killing", a noun derived from *mer- "to die". 

Proto-Germanic in fact had two nouns derived from this word, later merging into the modern English noun: *murþrą "death, killing, murder" (directly from Proto-Indo-European*mŕ̥-trom), whence Old English morðor "secret or unlawful killing of a person, murder; mortal sin, crime; punishment, torment, misery"; and *murþrijô "murderer; homicide" (from the verb *murþrijaną "to murder"), giving Old English myrþra "homicide, murder; murderer". There was a third word for "murder" in Proto-Germanic, continuing Proto-Indo-European *mr̥tós "dead" (compare Latin mors), giving Proto-Germanic *murþą "death, killing, murder" and Old English morþ "death, crime, murder" (compare German Mord).

The -d- first attested in Middle English mordre, mourdre, murder, murdre could have been influenced by Old French murdre, itself derived from the Germanic noun via Frankish *murþra (compare Old High German murdreo, murdiro), though the same sound development can be seen with burden (from burthen). The alternative murther (attested up to the 19th century) springs directly from the Old English forms. Middle English mordre is a verb from Anglo-Saxon myrðrian from Proto-Germanic *murþrijaną, or, according to the Oxford English Dictionary, from the noun.

Use of the term
In many countries, in news reports, out of concern for being accused of defamation, journalists are generally careful not to identify a suspect as a murderer until the suspect is convicted of murder in a court of law. After arrest, for example, journalists may instead write that the person was "arrested on suspicion of murder", or, after a prosecutor files charges, as an "accused murderer".

Opponents of abortion consider abortion a form of murder. In some countries, a fetus is a legal person who can be murdered, and killing a pregnant woman is considered a double homicide.

Definition

The eighteenth-century English jurist William Blackstone (citing Edward Coke), in his Commentaries on the Laws of England set out the common law definition of murder, which by this definition occurs

The elements of common law murder are:

 unlawful
 killing
 through criminal act or omission
 of a human
 by another human
 with malice aforethought.

Baker observes: "The requirements for both murder and manslaughter are the same except in respect of the fault element and mitigating circumstances. Murder requires, positively, the mental element traditionally known as “malice aforethought,” and, negatively, the absence of certain mitigating circumstances (such as “loss of control” or “diminished responsibility”) that would turn the case into one of voluntary manslaughter.During the formative period of the common law the distinction between murder and manslaughter was of great moment for the defendant, because murder was punished by death, unless the Crown respited the sentence, whereas a person convicted of manslaughter generally escaped that penalty owing to the indulgence known as benefit of clergy; when benefit of clergy was abolished the sentence was changed to a maximum of imprisonment for life." Baker, Glanville Williams & Dennis Baker Treatise of Criminal Law (Lexis 2021) at p. 804 </ref>https://www.lexisnexis.co.uk/store/products/glanville-williams-dennis-baker-treatise-of-criminal-law-5th-edition-skuuksku9781474320184GWTCL585599/details</ref>
 Unlawful – This distinguishes murder from killings that are done within the boundaries of law, such as capital punishment, justified self-defense, or the killing of enemy combatants by lawful combatants as well as causing collateral damage to non-combatants during a war.
 Killing – At common law life ended with cardiopulmonary arrest – the total and irreversible cessation of blood circulation and respiration. With advances in medical technology courts have adopted irreversible cessation of all brain function as marking the end of life.
 Criminal act or omission – Killing can be committed by an act or an omission.
 Of a human – This element presents the issue of when life begins. At common law, a fetus was not a human being. Life began when the fetus passed through the vagina and took its first breath.
 By another human – In early common law, suicide was considered murder. The requirement that the person killed be someone other than the perpetrator excluded suicide from the definition of murder.
 With malice aforethought – Originally malice aforethought carried its everyday meaning – a deliberate and premeditated (prior intent) killing of another motivated by ill will. Murder necessarily required that an appreciable time pass between the formation and execution of the intent to kill. The courts broadened the scope of murder by eliminating the requirement of actual premeditation and deliberation as well as true malice. All that was required for malice aforethought to exist is that the perpetrator act with one of the four states of mind that constitutes "malice".

The four states of mind recognized as constituting "malice" are:

Under state of mind (i), intent to kill, the deadly weapon rule applies. Thus, if the defendant intentionally uses a deadly weapon or instrument against the victim, such use authorizes a permissive inference of intent to kill.  Examples of deadly weapons and instruments include but are not limited to guns, knives, deadly toxins or chemicals or gases and even vehicles when intentionally used to harm one or more victims.

Under state of mind (iii), an "abandoned and malignant heart", the killing must result from the defendant's conduct involving a reckless indifference to human life and a conscious disregard of an unreasonable risk of death or serious bodily injury. In Australian jurisdictions, the unreasonable risk must amount to a foreseen probability of death (or grievous bodily harm in most states), as opposed to possibility.

Under state of mind (iv), the felony-murder doctrine, the felony committed must be an inherently dangerous felony, such as burglary, arson, rape, robbery or kidnapping. Importantly, the underlying felony cannot be a lesser included offense such as assault, otherwise all criminal homicides would be murder as all are felonies.

In Spanish criminal law, murder takes place when any of these requirements concur: Treachery (the use of means to avoid risk for the aggressor or to ensure that the crime goes unpunished), price or reward (financial gain) or viciousness (deliberately increasing the pain of the victim). After the last reform of the Spanish Criminal Code, in force since July 1, 2015, another circumstance that turns homicide into murder is the desire to facilitate the commission of another crime or to prevent it from being discovered.

As with most legal terms, the precise definition of murder varies between jurisdictions and is usually codified in some form of legislation. Even when the legal distinction between murder and manslaughter is clear, it is not unknown for a jury to find a murder defendant guilty of the lesser offense. The jury might sympathize with the defendant (e.g. in a crime of passion, or in the case of a bullied victim who kills their tormentor), and the jury may wish to protect the defendant from a sentence of life imprisonment or execution.

Degrees of murder 

Some jurisdictions divide murder by degrees. The distinction between first- and second-degree murder exists, for example, in Canadian murder law and U.S. murder law.

The most common division is between first- and second-degree murder. Generally, second-degree murder is common law murder, and first-degree is an aggravated form. The aggravating factors of first-degree murder depend on the jurisdiction, but may include a specific intent to kill, premeditation, or deliberation. In some, murders committed by acts such as strangulation, poisoning, or lying in wait are also treated as first-degree murder. A few states in the U.S. further distinguish third-degree murder, but they differ significantly in which kinds of murders they classify as second-degree versus third-degree. For example, Minnesota defines third-degree murder as depraved-heart murder, whereas Florida defines third-degree murder as felony murder (except when the underlying felony is specifically listed in the definition of first-degree murder).

Some jurisdictions also distinguish premeditated murder. This is the crime of wrongfully and intentionally causing the death of another human being (also known as murder) after rationally considering the timing or method of doing so, in order to either increase the likelihood of success, or to evade detection or apprehension. State laws in the United States vary as to definitions of "premeditation". In some states, premeditation may be construed as taking place mere seconds before the murder. Premeditated murder is one of the most serious forms of homicide, and is punished more severely than manslaughter or other types of homicide, often with a life sentence without the possibility of parole, or in some countries, the death penalty. In the U.S, federal law criminalizes premeditated murder, felony murder and second-degree murder committed under situations where federal jurisdiction applies. In Canada, the criminal code classifies murder as either first- or second-degree. The former type of murder is often called premeditated murder, although premeditation is not the only way murder can be classified as first-degree.

Common law
According to Blackstone, English common law identified murder as a public wrong. According to common law, murder is considered to be malum in se, that is, an act which is evil within itself. An act such as murder is wrong or evil by its very nature, and it is the very nature of the act which does not require any specific detailing or definition in the law to consider murder a crime.

Some jurisdictions still take a common law view of murder. In such jurisdictions, what is considered to be murder is defined by precedent case law or previous decisions of the courts of law. However, although the common law is by nature flexible and adaptable, in the interests both of certainty and of securing convictions, most common law jurisdictions have codified their criminal law and now have statutory definitions of murder.

Exclusions

General
Although laws vary by country, there are circumstances of exclusion that are common in many legal systems.
 The killing of enemy combatants who have not surrendered, when committed by lawful combatants in accordance with lawful orders in war, is generally not considered murder.  Illicit killings within a war may constitute murder or homicidal war crimes; see Laws of war.
 Self-defense: acting in self-defense or in defense of another person is generally accepted as legal justification for killing a person in situations that would otherwise have been murder. However, a self-defense killing might be considered manslaughter if the killer established control of the situation before the killing took place. In the case of self-defense, it is called a "justifiable homicide".
 Unlawful killings without malice or intent are considered manslaughter.
 In many common law countries, provocation is a partial defense to a charge of murder which acts by converting what would otherwise have been murder into manslaughter (this is voluntary manslaughter, which is more severe than involuntary manslaughter).
 Accidental killings are considered homicides. Depending on the circumstances, these may or may not be considered criminal offenses; they are often considered manslaughter.
 Suicide does not constitute murder in most societies. Assisting a suicide, however, may be considered murder in some circumstances.

Specific to certain countries
 Capital punishment: some countries practice the death penalty. Capital punishment may be ordered by a legitimate court of law as the result of a conviction in a criminal trial with due process for a serious crime. All member states of the Council of Europe are prohibited from using the death penalty.
 Euthanasia, doctor-assisted suicide: the administration of lethal drugs by a doctor to a terminally ill patient, if the intention is solely to alleviate pain, in many jurisdictions it is seen as a special case (see the doctrine of double effect and the case of Dr John Bodkin Adams).
 Killing to prevent the theft of one's property may be legal under certain circumstances, depending on the jurisdiction. In 2013, a jury in south Texas acquitted a man who killed a sex worker who attempted to run away with his money.
 Killing an intruder who is found by an owner to be in the owner's home (having entered unlawfully): legal in most US states (see Castle doctrine).
 Killing to prevent specific forms of aggravated rape or sexual assault – killing of attacker by the potential victim or by witnesses to the scene; legal in parts of the US and in various other countries.
 In some countries, the killing of a woman or girl in specific circumstances (e.g., when she commits adultery and is killed by her husband or other family members, known as honor killing) is not considered murder.
 In the United States, in most states and in federal jurisdiction, a killing by a police officer is excluded from prosecution if the officer reasonably believes they are being threatened with deadly force by the victim. This may include such actions by the victim as reaching into a glove compartment or pocket for license and registration, if the officer reasonably believes that the victim might be reaching for a gun. (Although it is often not considered murder even when an officer is not threatened).

Victim
All jurisdictions require that the victim be a natural person; that is, a human being who was still alive before being murdered. In other words, under the law one cannot murder a corpse, a corporation, a non-human animal, or any other non-human organism such as a plant or bacterium.

California's murder statute, penal code section 187, expressly mentioned a fetus as being capable of being killed, and was interpreted by the Supreme Court of California in 1994 as not requiring any proof of the viability of the fetus as a prerequisite to a murder conviction. This holding has two implications. Firstly, a defendant in California can be convicted of murder for killing a fetus which the mother herself could have terminated without committing a crime. And secondly, as stated by Justice Stanley Mosk in his dissent, because women carrying nonviable fetuses may not be visibly pregnant, it may be possible for a defendant to be convicted of intentionally murdering a person they did not know existed.

Mitigating circumstances
Some countries allow conditions that "affect the balance of the mind" to be regarded as mitigating circumstances. This means that a person may be found guilty of "manslaughter" on the basis of "diminished responsibility" rather than being found guilty of murder, if it can be proved that the killer was suffering from a condition that affected their judgment at the time. Depression, post-traumatic stress disorder and medication side-effects are examples of conditions that may be taken into account when assessing responsibility.

Insanity

Mental disorder may apply to a wide range of disorders including psychosis caused by schizophrenia and dementia, and excuse the person from the need to undergo the stress of a trial as to liability. Usually, sociopathy and other personality disorders are not legally considered insanity. In some jurisdictions, following the pre-trial hearing to determine the extent of the disorder, the defense of "not guilty by reason of insanity" may be used to get a not guilty verdict. This defense has two elements:

 That the defendant had a serious mental illness, disease, or defect
 That the defendant's mental condition, at the time of the killing, rendered the perpetrator unable to determine right from wrong, or that what they were doing was wrong

Under New York law, for example:

Under the French Penal Code:

Those who successfully argue a defense based on a mental disorder are usually referred to mandatory clinical treatment until they are certified safe to be released back into the community, rather than prison.

Postpartum depression
Postpartum depression (also known as post-natal depression) is recognized in some countries as a mitigating factor in cases of infanticide. According to  Susan Friedman, "Two dozen nations have infanticide laws that decrease the penalty for mothers who kill their children of up to one year of age. The United States does not have such a law, but mentally ill mothers may plead not guilty by reason of insanity." In the law of the Republic of Ireland, infanticide was made a separate crime from murder in 1949, applicable for the mother of a baby under one year old where "the balance of her mind was disturbed by reason of her not having fully recovered from the effect of giving birth to the child or by reason of the effect of lactation consequent upon the birth of the child". Since independence, death sentences for murder in such cases had always been commuted; the new act was intended "to eliminate all the terrible ritual of the black cap and the solemn words of the judge pronouncing sentence of death in those cases ... where it is clear to the Court and to everybody, except perhaps the unfortunate accused, that the sentence will never be carried out." In Russia, murder of a newborn child by the mother has been a separate crime since 1996.

Unintentional
For a killing to be considered murder in nine out of fifty states in the US, there normally needs to be an element of intent. A defendant may argue that they took precautions not to kill, that the death could not have been anticipated, or was unavoidable. As a general rule, manslaughter constitutes reckless killing, but manslaughter also includes criminally negligent (i.e. grossly negligent) homicide.  Unintentional killing that results from an involuntary action generally cannot constitute murder. After examining the evidence, a judge or jury (depending on the jurisdiction) would determine whether the killing was intentional or unintentional.

Diminished capacity
In jurisdictions using the Uniform Penal Code, such as California, diminished capacity may be a defense. For example, Dan White used this defense to obtain a manslaughter conviction, instead of murder, in the assassination of Mayor George Moscone and Supervisor Harvey Milk. Afterward, California amended its penal code to provide "As a matter of public policy there shall be no defense of diminished capacity, diminished responsibility, or irresistible impulse in a criminal action...."

Aggravating circumstances
Murder with specified aggravating circumstances is often punished more harshly. Depending on the jurisdiction, such circumstances may include:
 Premeditation
 Poisoning
 Murder of a child
 Murder committed during sexual assault
 Multiple murders committed within one criminal transaction or in different transactions as part of one broader scheme
 Murder of a police officer, judge, firefighter or witness to a crime
 Murder of a pregnant woman
 Crime committed for pay or other reward, such as contract killing
 Exceptional brutality or cruelty
 Murder committed by an offender previously convicted of murder
 Methods which are dangerous to the public e.g. explosion, arson, shooting in a crowd etc.
 Murder for a political cause
 Murder committed in order to conceal another crime or facilitate its commission.
 Hate crimes, which occur when a perpetrator targets a victim because of their perceived membership in a certain social group.
 Treachery (e.g. Heimtücke in German law)

In the United States and Canada, these murders are referred to as first-degree or aggravated murders. Under English criminal law, murder always carries a mandatory life sentence, but is not classified into degrees. Penalties for murder committed under aggravating circumstances are often higher under English law than the 15-year minimum non-parole period that otherwise serves as a starting point for a murder committed by an adult.

Felony murder rule

A legal doctrine in some common law jurisdictions  broadens the crime of murder: when an offender kills in the commission of a dangerous crime, (regardless of intent), he or she is guilty of murder. The felony murder rule is often justified by its supporters as a means of preventing dangerous felonies, but the case of Ryan Holle shows it can be used very widely.

Year-and-a-day rule

In some common law jurisdictions, a defendant accused of murder is not guilty if the victim survives for longer than one year and one day after the attack. This reflects the likelihood that if the victim dies, other factors will have contributed to the cause of death, breaking the chain of causation; and also means that the responsible person does not have a charge of murder "hanging over their head indefinitely". Subject to any statute of limitations, the accused could still be charged with an offense reflecting the seriousness of the initial assault.

With advances in modern medicine, most countries have abandoned a fixed time period and test causation on the facts of the case. This is known as "delayed death" and cases where this was applied or was attempted to be applied go back to at least 1966.

In England and Wales, the "year-and-a-day rule" was abolished by the Law Reform (Year and a Day Rule) Act 1996. However, if death occurs three years or more after the original attack then prosecution can take place only with the attorney-general's approval.

In the United States, many jurisdictions have abolished the rule as well. Abolition of the rule has been accomplished by enactment of statutory criminal codes, which had the effect of displacing the common-law definitions of crimes and corresponding defenses. In 2001 the Supreme Court of the United States held that retroactive application of a state supreme court decision abolishing the year-and-a-day rule did not violate the Ex Post Facto Clause of Article I of the United States Constitution.

The potential effect of fully abolishing the rule can be seen in the case of 74-year-old William Barnes, charged with the murder of a Philadelphia police officer Walter T. Barclay Jr., who he had shot nearly 41 years previously. Barnes had served 16 years in prison for attempting to murder Barkley, but when the policeman died on August 19, 2007, this was alleged to be from complications of the wounds suffered from the shooting – and Barnes was charged with his murder. He was acquitted on May 24, 2010.

Contributing factors 
According to Peter Morall, the motivations for murder fit into the following 4 categories:

 Lust: The murderer seeks to kill rivals to obtain objects of their sexual desire
 Love: The murderer seeks to "mercy kill" a loved one with a major deformity or an incurable illness.
 Loathing: The murderer seeks to kill a loathed person (such as an abusive parent) or members of a loathed group or culture.
 Loot: The murderer seeks some form of financial gain.

Morall argues that a motive alone is insufficient to explain criminal killing, as people can experience those impulses without killing. Morall insists risk factors that may increase the chance that somebody will commit a murder include:

 Testosterone, the primary male sex hormone, is correlated with competitive and assertive behaviour.
 Reduction in serotonin increases likelihood of impulsive hostile behaviour.
 Alteration in the breakdown of glucose appears to affect mood and behaviour.
 Hyperglycemia and Hypoglycemia can both lead to aggression.
 Consumption of alcohol can lead to reduced self control.
 Environmental pollutants circulating in the body are linked to heightened aggression.
 Malnutrition from eating too much junk food can provoke aggressive behaviour and even murder.

Certain personality disorders are associated with an increased homicide rate, most notably narcissistic, anti-social, and histrionic personality disorders and those associated with psychopathology.

Some aspects of homicides, including the genetic relations or proximity between murderers and their victims, (as in the Cinderella effect), may potentially be explained by the evolution theory or evolutionary psychology.

Several studies have shown that there is a correlation between murder rates and poverty. A 2000 study showed that regions of the state of São Paulo in Brazil with lower income also had higher rates of murder.

Religious attitudes

Abrahamic context 

In the Abrahamic religions, the first ever murder was committed by Cain against his brother Abel out of jealousy. In the past, certain types of homicide were lawful and justified. Georg Oesterdiekhoff wrote:

In many such societies the redress was not via a legal system, but by blood revenge, although there might also be a form of payment that could be made instead—such as the weregild which in early Germanic society could be paid to the victim's family in lieu of their right of revenge.

One of the oldest-known prohibitions against murder appears in the Sumerian Code of Ur-Nammu written sometime between 2100 and 2050 BC. The code states, "If a man commits a murder, that man must be killed."

Judeo-Christian standard 
In Judeo-Christian traditions, the prohibition against murder is one of the Ten Commandments given by God to Moses in (Exodus: 20v13) and (Deuteronomy 5v17). The Vulgate and subsequent early English translations of the Bible used the term secretly killeth his neighbour or smiteth his neighbour secretly rather than murder for the Latin clam percusserit proximum. Later editions such as Young's Literal Translation and the World English Bible have translated the Latin occides simply as murder rather than the alternatives of kill, assassinate, fall upon, or slay.

In Islam 
In Islam according to the Qur'an, one of the greatest sins is to kill a human being who has committed no fault.

"Do not take a ˹human˺ life—made sacred by Allah—except with ˹legal˺ right."  

"That is why We ordained for the Children of Israel that whoever takes a life—unless as a punishment for murder or mischief in the land—it will be as if they killed all of humanity; and whoever saves a life, it will be as if they saved all of humanity."  

"˹They are˺ those who do not invoke any other god besides Allah, nor take a ˹human˺ life—made sacred by Allah—except with ˹legal˺ right,1 nor commit fornication. And whoever does ˹any of˺ this will face the penalty."

Historical attitudes 
The term assassin derives from Hashshashin, a militant Ismaili Shi'ite sect, active from the 8th to 14th centuries. This mystic secret society killed members of the Abbasid, Fatimid, Seljuq and Crusader elite for political and religious reasons. The Thuggee cult that plagued India was devoted to Kali, the goddess of death and destruction. According to some estimates the Thuggees murdered 1 million people between 1740 and 1840. The Aztecs believed that without regular offerings of blood the sun god Huitzilopochtli would withdraw his support for them and destroy the world as they knew it. According to Ross Hassig, author of Aztec Warfare, "between 10,000 and 80,400 persons" were sacrificed in the 1487 re-consecration of the Great Pyramid of Tenochtitlan. Japanese samurai had the right to strike with their sword at anyone of a lower class who compromised their honour.

Slavery 
Southern slave codes did make willful killing of a slave illegal in most cases. For example, the 1860 Mississippi case of Oliver v. State charged the defendant with murdering his own slave. In 1811, the wealthy white planter Arthur Hodge was hanged for murdering several of his slaves on his plantation in the Virgin Islands.

Honor killings in Corsica 
In Corsica, vendetta was a social code that required Corsicans to kill anyone who wronged their family honor. Between 1821 and 1852, no fewer than 4,300 murders were perpetrated in Corsica.

Incidence

The World Health Organization reported in October 2002 that a person is murdered every 60 seconds. An estimated 520,000 people were murdered in 2000 around the globe. Another study estimated the worldwide murder rate at 456,300 in 2010 with a 35% increase since 1990. Two-fifths of them were young people between the ages of 10 and 29 who were killed by other young people. Because murder is the least likely crime to go unreported, statistics of murder are seen as a bellwether of overall crime rates.

Murder rates vary greatly among countries and societies around the world. In the Western world, murder rates in most countries have declined significantly during the 20th century and are now between 1 and 4 cases per 100,000 people per year. Latin America and the Caribbean, the region with the highest murder rate in the world, experienced more than 2.5 million murders between 2000 and 2017.

Murder rates by varies countries
Murder rates in jurisdictions such as Japan, Singapore, Hong Kong, Iceland, Switzerland, Italy, Spain and Germany are among the lowest in the world, around 0.3–1 cases per 100,000 people per year; the rate of the United States is among the highest of developed countries, around 4.5 in 2014, with rates in larger cities sometimes over 40 per 100,000. The top ten highest murder rates are in Honduras (91.6 per 100,000), El Salvador, Ivory Coast, Venezuela, Belize, Jamaica, U.S. Virgin Islands, Guatemala, Saint Kitts and Nevis and Zambia. (UNODC, 2011 – full table here).

The following absolute murder counts per-country are not comparable because they are not adjusted by each country's total population. Nonetheless, they are included here for reference, with 2010 used as the base year (they may or may not include justifiable homicide, depending on the jurisdiction). There were 52,260 murders in Brazil, consecutively elevating the record set in 2009. Over half a million people were shot to death in Brazil between 1979 and 2003. 33,335 murder cases were registered across India, approximately 17,000 murders in Colombia (the murder rate was 38 per 100,000 people, in 2008 murders went down to 15,000), approximately 16,000 murders in South Africa, approximately 15,000 murders in the United States, approximately 26,000 murders in Mexico, about 8,000 murders committed in Russia, approximately 13,000 murders in Venezuela, approximately 4,000 murders in El Salvador, approximately 1,400 murders in Jamaica, approximately 550 murders in Canada and approximately 470 murders in Trinidad and Tobago. Pakistan reported 12,580 murders.

Murder in the United States 

In the United States, 666,160 people were killed between 1960 and 1996. Approximately 90% of murders in the US are committed by males. Between 1976 and 2005, 23.5% of all murder victims and 64.8% of victims murdered by intimate partners were female. For women in the US, homicide is the leading cause of death in the workplace.

In the US, murder is the leading cause of death for African American males aged 15 to 34. Between 1976 and 2008, African Americans were victims of 329,825 homicides. In 2006, Federal Bureau of Investigation's Supplementary Homicide Report indicated that nearly half of the 14,990 murder victims that year were Black (7421). In the year 2007, there were 3,221 black victims and 3,587 white victims of non-negligent homicides. While 2,905 of the black victims were killed by a black offender, 2,918 of the white victims were killed by white offenders. There were 566 white victims of black offenders and 245 black victims of white offenders. The "white" category in the Uniform Crime Reports (UCR) includes non-black Hispanics. 
Murder demographics are affected by the improvement of trauma care, which has resulted in reduced lethality of violent assaults – thus the murder rate may not necessarily indicate the overall level of social violence.

Workplace homicide, which tripled during the 1980s, is the fastest growing category of murder in America.

Development of murder rates over time in different countries is often used by both supporters and opponents of capital punishment and gun control. Using properly filtered data, it is possible to make the case for or against either of these issues. For example, one could look at murder rates in the United States from 1950 to 2000, and notice that those rates went up sharply shortly after a moratorium on death sentences was effectively imposed in the late 1960s. This fact has been used to argue that capital punishment serves as a deterrent and, as such, it is morally justified. Capital punishment opponents frequently counter that the United States has much higher murder rates than Canada and most European Union countries, although all those countries have abolished the death penalty. Overall, the global pattern is too complex, and on average, the influence of both these factors may not be significant and could be more social, economic, and cultural.

Despite the immense improvements in forensics in the past few decades, the fraction of murders solved has decreased in the United States, from 90% in 1960 to 61% in 2007. Solved murder rates in major U.S. cities varied in 2007 from 36% in Boston, Massachusetts to 76% in San Jose, California. Major factors affecting the arrest rate include witness cooperation and the number of people assigned to investigate the case.

History of murder rates

According to scholar Pieter Spierenburg homicide rates per 100,000 in Europe have fallen over the centuries, from 35 per 100,000 in medieval times, to 20 in 1500 AD, 5 in 1700, to below two per 100,000 in 1900.

In the United States, murder rates have been higher and have fluctuated. They fell below 2 per 100,000 by 1900, rose during the first half of the century, dropped in the years following World War II, and bottomed out at 4.0 in 1957 before rising again. The rate stayed in 9 to 10 range most of the period from 1972 to 1994, before falling to 5 in present times. The increase since 1957 would have been even greater if not for the significant improvements in medical techniques and emergency response times, which mean that more and more attempted homicide victims survive. According to one estimate, if the lethality levels of criminal assaults of 1964 still applied in 1993, the country would have seen the murder rate of around 26 per 100,000, almost triple the actually observed rate of 9.5 per 100,000.

A similar, but less pronounced pattern has been seen in major European countries as well. The murder rate in the United Kingdom fell to 1 per 100,000 by the beginning of the 20th century and as low as 0.62 per 100,000 in 1960, and was at 1.28 per 100,000 . The murder rate in France (excluding Corsica) bottomed out after World War II at less than 0.4 per 100,000, quadrupling to 1.6 per 100,000 since then.

The specific factors driving this dynamics in murder rates are complex and not universally agreed upon. Much of the raise in the U.S. murder rate during the first half of the 20th century is generally thought to be attributed to gang violence associated with Prohibition. Since most murders are committed by young males, the near simultaneous low in the murder rates of major developed countries circa 1960 can be attributed to low birth rates during the Great Depression and World War II. Causes of further moves are more controversial. Some of the more exotic factors claimed to affect murder rates include the availability of abortion and the likelihood of chronic exposure to lead during childhood (due to the use of leaded paint in houses and tetraethyllead as a gasoline additive in internal combustion engines).

Investigation

The success rate of criminal investigations into murders (the clearance rate) tends to be relatively high for murder compared to other crimes, due to its seriousness. In the United States, the clearance rate was 62.6% in 2004.

See also

Lists related to murder
 Lists of murders
 List of types of killing
 Axe murder
 List of unsolved deaths

Related topics

 Child murder
 Culpable homicide
 Depraved-heart murder
 Double murder
 Execution-style murder
 Letting die
 Mass murder
 Misdemeanor murder
 Murder conviction without a body
 Seven laws of Noah
 Stigmatized property
 Thrill killing
 Capital murder
 Assassination, the murder of a prominent person, such as a head of state or head of government.

Murder laws by country

 Australia
 Brazil
 Canada
 China
 Cuba
 Denmark
 England and Wales
 Finland
 France
 Germany
 Hong Kong
 India
 Israel
 Italy
 Netherlands
 Northern Ireland
 Norway
 Peru
 Portugal
 Romania
 Russia
 Sweden
 Switzerland
 United States

Notes

References

Bibliography
 Lord Mustill on the Common Law concerning murder
 Sir Edward Coke Co. Inst., Pt. III, ch.7, p. 50

External links

 Introduction and Updated Information on the Seville Statement on Violence
 The Seville Statement
 Atlas of United States Mortality – U.S. Centers for Disease Control
 Cezanne's depiction of "The Murder" – National Museums Liverpool

 
Crimes
Crimes against humanity
Violent crime
Violence
Killings by type